
Ch'uxña Quta (Aymara ch'uxña green, "green lake", hispanicized spelling Chojña Kkota) is a lake on the west side of the Apolobamba mountain range of Bolivia situated in the La Paz Department, Bautista Saavedra Province, Charasani Municipality, Charasani Canton. It is situated east of Such'i River, southeast of the larger lake Janq'u Qala and west of Qachu Quta (Llachu Quta).

See also 
 Apolobamba Integrated Management Natural Area

References 

Lakes of La Paz Department (Bolivia)